Alexei Barbăneagră (born 3 December 1945) is a lawyer from the Republic of Moldova, who served as  Minister of Justice from 6 June 1990 to 5 April 1994 in Mircea Druc Cabinet.

External links 
 Alexei Barbăneagră la 60 de ani

References

1945 births
Living people
Moldova State University alumni
Moldovan jurists
Moldovan Ministers of Justice
Popular Front of Moldova politicians
Moldovan MPs 2009–2010